Waldron Faulkner  (1898–1979) was an American architect in practice in New York City and Washington, D.C. from 1927 to 1968.

Life and career
Herbert Winthrop Waldron Faulkner was born January 21, 1898, in Paris to American parents. He was educated at Yale University, graduating with a BFA in architecture in 1924. He worked for New York City architects Richard Henry Dana IV, York & Sawyer, James Gamble Rogers and Leigh French Jr. before opening his own office in 1927. In 1934 he moved to Washington. In 1935 he hired Slocum Kingsbury , a coworker from York & Sawyer, and in 1939 they formed a partnership, Faulkner & Kingsbury. In 1946 the partnership was expanded to include another employee, John W. Stenhouse, as Faulkner, Kingsbury & Stenhouse. They practiced together until Kingsbury's retirement in 1964, and in 1966 the partnership was reorganized to include Frederick L. Fryer and Faulkner's son, Avery C. Faulkner, as Faulkner, Stenhouse, Fryer & Faulkner. Faulkner retired from active practice in 1968. The firm, afterwards led by the younger Faulkner, was renamed Faulkner, Fryer & Vanderpool and was ultimately acquired by Cannon Design of Grand Island, New York, now CannonDesign, in 1982.

Faulkner first came to prominence in the late 1920s as the architect of the Avery Coonley School in Downers Grove, Illinois, founded by his mother-in-law, Queene (Ferry) Coonley. After his move to Washington he was noted as an architect of public-facing buildings, including extensive work for George Washington University and American University. The office was also architect for many hospitals, the design of which was usually led by his partner, Kingsbury. Faulkner's last major work was the conversion of the Old Patent Office Building into the Smithsonian American Art Museum and the National Portrait Gallery, which both opened in 1968.

Faulkner joined the American Institute of Architects in 1929, and was elected a Fellow in 1951. Faulkner was president of the Washington chapter for the year 1942–43 and was chair of the national library committee from 1954 to 1963. Faulkner was an authority on the use of color in architecture, and in 1949 he was appointed AIA delegate to the Inter-Society Color Council, of which he was president from 1956 to 1958. He was the author of Architecture and Color, published by John Wiley & Sons in 1972.

Personal life
Faulkner was married in 1926 to Elizabeth Coonley, the daughter of Chicago industrialist Avery Coonley. They had two sons, Winthrop W. Faulkner and Avery C. Faulkner, both architects, and one daughter, Celia. Faulkner died May 11, 1979, at home in Washington at the age of 81.

Architectural works

Waldron Faulkner, 1927–1939
 Avery Coonley School, 1400 Maple Ave, Downers Grove, Illinois (1928–29, NRHP 2009)
 Hattie M. Strong Residence Hall, George Washington University, Washington, D.C. (1934–36, NRHP 1991)
 Bell Hall, George Washington University, Washington, D.C. (1935)
 Stuart Hall, George Washington University, Washington, D.C. (1936)
 Waldron Faulkner house, 3415 36th St NW, Washington, D.C. (1937)
 Hall of Government, George Washington University, Washington, D.C. (1938–39)
 Lisner Hall, George Washington University, Washington, D.C. (1939–40)

Faulkner & Kingsbury, 1939–1946
 Baldwin House, Vassar College, Poughkeepsie, New York (1939–40)
 Lisner Auditorium, George Washington University, Washington, D.C. (1940–46, NRHP 1990)

Faulkner, Kingsbury & Stenhouse, 1946–1966
 George Washington University Hospital, 901 23rd St NW, Washington, D.C. (1948, demolished 2003)
 Hannah Harrison School, 4470 MacArthur Blvd NW, Washington, D.C. (1950, demolished)
 Potomac School, 1301 Potomac School Rd, McLean, Virginia (1951)
 Bethesda Public Library, 7400 Arlington Rd, Bethesda, Maryland (1952, demolished)
 New Orleans VA Medical Center (former), 1601 Perdido St, New Orleans, Louisiana (1952)
 Broadcast House, 4001 Brandywine St NW, Washington, D.C. (1953)
 Providence Hospital, 1150 Varnum St NE, Washington, D.C. (1954)
 Armed Forces Institute of Pathology (former), 7144 13th Pl NW, Washington, D.C. (1955)
 American Association for the Advancement of Science building (former), 1515 Massachusetts Ave NW, Washington, D.C. (1956)
 Brookings Institution building, Washington, D.C. (1957)
 Washington Evening Star building (former), 225 Virginia Ave SE, Washington, D.C. (1958, altered)
 Lyndon Baines Johnson Department of Education Building, 400 Maryland Ave SW, Washington, D.C. (1959–61)
 Setting of the Equestrian statue of Simón Bolívar, Virginia Ave NW, Washington, D.C. (1959)
 American Chemical Society building, 1155 16th St NW, Washington, D.C. (1960, altered)
 St. Agnes Hospital, 900 S Caton Ave, Baltimore, Maryland (1961)
 Holy Cross Hospital, 1500 Forest Glen Rd, Silver Spring, Maryland (1963)
 McLean Medical Building, 1515 Chain Bridge Rd, McLean, Virginia (1965)
 Old Patent Office Building remodeling, 8th and G Sts NW, Washington, D.C. (1965–68)

Faulkner, Stenhouse, Fryer & Faulkner, 1966–1968
 Beeghly Chemical Building, American University, Washington, D.C. (1967)
 Sacred Heart Hospital, 900 Seton Dr, Cumberland, Maryland (1967, demolished)

Notes

References

1898 births
1979 deaths
Architects from Washington, D.C.
Fellows of the American Institute of Architects
20th-century American architects